Tolui (also Toluy, Tului;   – 1232) was a Mongol khan, the fourth son of Genghis Khan by his chief khatun, Börte. At his father's death in 1227, his ulus, or territorial inheritance, was the Mongol homelands on the Mongolian Plateau, and he also served as civil administrator until 1229, the time it took to confirm Ögedei as the second Great Khan of the Mongol Empire (1206–1368). Before that, he had served with distinction in the campaigns against the Jin dynasty, the Western Xia and the Khwarezmid Empire, where he was instrumental in the capture and massacre at Merv and Nishapur. He is a direct ancestor of most of the Ilkhanids.

Tolui never used the title of Khagan himself; neither Genghis Khan nor his immediate three successors would ever use any era names unlike the neighboring Central Plain dynasties in the south. Tolui was posthumously elevated to the status of monarch by his son Möngke and was given the temple name by his other son Kublai, when he established the Yuan dynasty a few decades later.

Life

Youth
During the rise of Genghis Khan, Tolui was too young to be involved in the battles. Tolui was almost killed by a Tatar when he was about five years of age. He was saved by his Geghis' sister-in-law Altani and Genghis ' two other companions. In 1203, his father bestowed on Tolui his wife Sorghaghtani, the niece of Ong Khan (an ally of Genghis). Their first son Möngke was born in 1209.

Early career
He first entered combat against the Jin dynasty in 1213, scaling the walls of Dexing with his brother-in-law Chiqu.

In 1221, Genghis Khan dispatched him to Khorasan in Iran. The cities in this area had revolted several times. The defenders of Nishapur killed Toquchar, the brother-in-law of Tolui in November 1221. Tolui's army evacuated Nishapur onto the plains. He ordered the total massacres of Nishapur and Merv.

Genghis Khan's succession
When Genghis Khan was deciding who should succeed him, he had trouble choosing between his four sons. Tolui had a strong reputation for his military skills, and was very successful as a general, but Genghis Khan chose Ögodei, who was more capable politically. Genghis Khan felt that Tolui would be too cautious to be an effective leader. Tolui was with his father on campaign against Xi Xia in 1227.

After Genghis Khan's death, Tolui generally supervised the Mongol Empire for two years. The Mongol nobles accepted this partly because of the tradition that the youngest son inherits his father's properties, and partly because Tolui had the largest and most powerful army in central Mongolia at the time. Tolui supported the choice of the next Khagan by election, and Ögedei was chosen, fulfilling his father's wishes.

Tolui campaigned with Ögedei in north China, serving as strategist and field commander in 1231–32. Two armies had been dispatched to besiege Kaifeng, the capital of the Jin. After most of the Jin's defences were breached, they returned north.

Death
According to The Secret History of the Mongols, Tolui sacrificed himself in order to cure Ögödei from a very severe illness during a campaign in China. The shamans had determined that the root of Ögödei's illness were China's spirits of earth and water, who were upset that their subjects had been driven away and their land devastated. Offering land, animals, and people had only led to an aggravation of Ögödei's illness, but when they offered to sacrifice a family member, Ögödei got better immediately. Tolui volunteered and died directly after consuming a cursed drink. However, Ata-Malik Juvayni says he died from alcoholism.

Wives, concubines, and children 

 Sorghaghtani Beki — daughter of Jakha Gambhu, the younger brother of the powerful Keraite leader Toghrul
 Möngke Khan: Great Khan (1251–1259) of the Mongol Empire.
 Kublai Khan: Great Khan (1260–1294) of the Mongol Empire and the Yuan dynasty
 Hulagu Khan: Khan (1256–1264) of the Ilkhanate dynasty that ruled Persia, Turkey, Georgia and Armenia.
 Ariq Böke: Declared Great Khan (rivalling Kublai) for a short period in 1260; he fought Kublai in the Toluid Civil War and would eventually be captured by Kublai in 1264.
 Lingqun khatun — daughter of Naiman khan and Qara-Khitai ruler Kuchlug
 Qutuqtu — killed in battle against general Meng Yu (孟珙) during Mongol conquest of Song China
 Kelmish agha — married to Saljidai Küregen of Khongirad
 Oljai Khatun — married to Mengu-Timur
El-Temür — married to Bars Buqa, grandson of Qutuqa Beki
 Saruq Khatun — nurse of Kublai, concubine from Naimans 
 Jörike — married Bulga, granddaughter of Anchen of Khongirads, died in youth.
 Möge — died during Mongol conquest of Song China
 Chingtüm
 Ebügen
 Mayiche — a concubine from Naimans
 Böchök — participated in Mongol invasion of Europe in 1236–41 and Möngke's election in 1250
 Nayan Khatun
 Doquz Khatun —granddaughter of Keraite khan Toghrul,
 Unknown wives
 Sögetei
 Sübügetei

Legacy
Perhaps more important than himself was the role of his family, the Toluids, in shaping the destinies of the Mongol Empire. Through his Nestorian Christian wife Sorghaghtani Beki, Tolui fathered Möngke, Kublai, Ariq Böke, and Hulagu. The first three of these would all go on to claim the title of Great Khan, while Hulagu founded the Ilkhanate and Kublai the Yuan dynasty of China. It was the rivalry between Tolui's own sons, Kublai and Ariq Böke, that fragmented the power of the empire and set the western khanates against each other in the Toluid Civil War between 1260 and 1264.

Rivalry between the Toluids and the sons of Ögedei and Jochi caused stagnation and infighting during the regency periods after the deaths of Ögedei and his son Güyük. Möngke posthumously awarded his father the title of Khagan in 1252. When Kublai Khan established the Yuan Dynasty in 1271, he had his father Tolui placed on the official record as Ruizong. Tolui's line ruled Mongolia and south Mongolia from 1251 to 1635, Mongolia until 1691, and Bukhara until 1920. 
He and his wife are honored beside Genghis Khan at the mausoleum constructed in the 1950s by the Chinese Communists in Inner Mongolia.

Ancestry

Depictions

Literature 

 Music in the Mirrors by Greg Kuznetsov, in which a Mongolian conqueror named Tolui loosely inspired by the historical figure is the main antagonist.

See also
 Möngke Khan
 Kublai Khan
 Hulagu Khan
 Yuan dynasty
 Ilkhanate
 Northern Yuan dynasty

Notes

References 

1191 births
1232 deaths
Mongol Empire people
13th-century Mongol rulers
Regents
13th-century viceregal rulers
13th-century Chinese monarchs
Sons of emperors